Disney Fantasy is a cruise ship owned and operated by Disney Cruise Line, a subsidiary of The Walt Disney Company.  Entering service in 2012, she is the line's fourth vessel and second ship of the Dream-class. Her sister ship, Disney Dream, was launched in 2011. The other four ships of the company fleet are the Disney Magic, Disney Wonder, Disney Dream, and Disney Wish. Her captain is Captain Michele Intartaglia.

History

In February 2007, Disney Cruise Line announced that it had commissioned two new ships for its fleet with Meyer Werft shipyards in Papenburg, Germany. The first steel-cut, for scrollwork on the ship's hull, took place in March 2009. Later that month, the two ships were named, with the Disney Fantasy set to enter service on March 31, 2012, a little over a year after its sister vessel, the Disney Dream.

Disney Fantasy has 1,250 passenger cabins.

The ship's keel was laid on February 11, 2011. Disney Cruise Line president,  Karl Holz, along with Minnie Mouse, officially placed a magic coin beneath the ship's hull. The coin is identical to that which was placed beneath the Disney Dream, however, featured the hull number S688, and the date of the keel laying.

On September 13, 2011 it was announced that the stern character on Disney Fantasy would be Dumbo, the Flying Elephant.

On December 9, 2011, Meyer Werft found several water lines open on the cruise ship. 48 cabins were damaged at a cost of approximately €1 million.

Disney Fantasy was floated out of the building dock on January 10, 2012, at Meyer Werft. Disney Fantasy was delivered to Disney Cruise Line on February 9, 2012, in Bremerhaven, Germany.

Disney Fantasy arrived in the United States for the first time, calling on New York, on February 28, 2012. The ship was formally named on March 1, 2012, in New York City. The "godmother" of the ship is Mariah Carey. A ceremony was held on the ship featuring performances in the Walt Disney Theatre. Neil Patrick Harris hosted and comedian Jerry Seinfeld performed during the show.

Ever since, Disney Fantasy has been based at Disney Cruise Line's terminal at Port Canaveral, Florida. and cruises to the Caribbean including visits to Disney's private island Castaway Cay.

In March 2020, cruises were suspended due to the COVID-19 pandemic. Disney Cruise Line extended its suspension of all departures several times, finally returning Disney Fantasy to active duty on September 11, 2021. On December 30, 2021, passengers were unable to debark the ship at St. Thomas due to a rise in onboard COVID-19 cases.

Facilities

Disney Fantasy has a water playground with  a water coaster, pop jets, geysers and bubblers featuring Huey, Dewey and Louie, instead of the Waves bar on the pool deck which is found on her sister ship the Disney Dream.

Disney Fantasy can play songs from Disney movies and parks using its  11 horns, specifically: "A Dream Is a Wish Your Heart Makes" from Cinderella, "Be Our Guest" from Beauty and the Beast, "Yo Ho (A Pirate's Life for Me)" from Pirates of the Caribbean, the Pinocchio songs "When You Wish Upon a Star" and "Hi-Diddle-Dee-Dee (An Actor's Life for Me)", "Do You Want to Build a Snowman?" from Frozen, and "It's a Small World (After All)". In addition its musical horns, during the "Star Wars Day At Sea" the ship can sound other horns, including: "The Imperial March" and a segment of the "Star Wars (Main Title)", and when in New York City, can play the beginning of "New York, New York" by Frank Sinatra.

References

External links 

 Official website of the Disney Cruise Line
 The Disney Fantasy | Disney Cruise Line

Ships of Disney Cruise Line
2012 ships
Ships built in Papenburg